The Santo Tomás de las Ollas hermitage is situated in the town with the same name close to Ponferrada, León (Spain).

History

The name of the hermitage, taken from the town Santo Tomás de las Ollas (St. Thomas of the Ollas), comes from the main occupation of that locality: pottery. They supplied to the Valle del Silencio zone.

The hermitage was donated to the community of San Pedro de Montes monastery by the Bishop of Astorga.

Architecture

See also
 History of medieval Arabic and Western European domes

Mozarabic architecture
Roman Catholic churches in Spain
Roman Catholic chapels in Spain